An imageboard is a type of Internet forum that focuses on the posting of images, often alongside text and discussion. The first imageboards were created in Japan as an extension of the textboard concept. These sites later inspired the creation of a number of English-language imageboards.

Characteristics 
Imageboards, similar to bulletin board systems, are used for discussions of a variety of topics. The primary focus of imageboards, however, is directed away from text posts, and is instead placed on picture posts. The two share many of the same structures, including separate forums for separate topics, as well as similar audiences. Imageboards are much more transitory with content—on some boards (especially highly trafficked ones), the thread deletion time can be as little as 10 minutes. In Japan, where imageboards are more common, topics will vary widely, ranging from trains to current news. The most popular English language imageboard, 4chan, similarly has a large variety of topics.

Imageboards are also different from online galleries in that most of the works posted are not made by the poster, but instead are taken from other online sources: galleries, other imageboards, and edited pictures.

Tripcodes 

Most imageboards and 2channel-style discussion boards allow (and encourage) anonymous posting and use a system of tripcodes instead of registration. A tripcode is the hashed result of a password that allows one's identity to be recognized without storing any data about users. Entering a particular password will let one "sign" one's posts with the tripcode generated from that password. Trying to take another user's tripcode and compute their password from it (for instance, to make posts that appear to come from a particular person) is somewhat computationally difficult. For those who want a custom tripcode, however, there are custom tripcode generators (which are technically tripcode crackers) available, such as Meriken's Tripcode Engine and MTY_CL. In general, anonymity is considered to be one of the advantages of an imageboard, and some boards have from time to time removed the ability to post with a name altogether (known as "forced anonymous/anonymity").

Secure tripcodes 
Due to the fact tripcodes can be cracked given enough time, some imageboards, such as 4chan and 8chan, implement a "secure" tripcode. Such tripcodes are not reproducible across different imageboards; they work by prepending a secure salt to the tripcode, barring intrusion, known only to the server owner. They therefore function closer to a username than to a cryptographic signature; this is why QAnon could not verify themselves on another website when 8chan went down in late 2019.

Software 
There are two primary types of imageboard software packages in widespread use: linearly directed imageboards modeled closely after Futaba Channel (in which content is posted through hierarchical subsections of topical interest, usually denoted by a forward slash such as "/f" for female), and nonlinear imageboards modeled after Danbooru (usually indicated by the usage of controlled folksonomic vocabulary for topical tagging and search).

Futaba Channel clones 
There are currently several Futaba-inspired imageboard software packages in widespread usage today, including Vichan, Kusaba/Kusaba X, and TinyIB.

Historical 
Futallaby is a PHP script based on the Futaba script from Futaba Channel. Although the Futallaby source is still freely available at 1chan, it is no longer in development, and the download page recommends using Wakaba instead, stating that "Wakaba can do everything Futallaby does and so much more." Futallaby started as a translation of Futaba, later retooled to support XHTML and customizable CSS styles.

Wakaba is a Perl imageboard script with a SQL backend to store thread information. It is designed to be more efficient and cleanly written than other scripts that are available, while preserving the same kind of functionality. Because of its focus on bare-bones functionality, Wakaba lacks many of the modern amenities provided by 4chan's Yotsuba, and newer imageboard scripts. A few users have attempted to remedy this by forking the original project and adding in features they consider beneficial. Two FOSS examples of this are frankusr's Wakaba fork, and the user experience focused Glaukaba.

Kusaba was a PHP-based modular imageboard software, which used MySQL. The creator has discontinued the project, in favor of developing TinyIB instead.

Kusaba X was a continuation of Kusaba by a separate developer. Like Kusaba, Kusaba X was written in PHP, and was designed with modularity in mind. It requires a MySQL or SQLite database to run. Kusaba and its derivatives were at one time some of the most popular imageboard solutions. Kusaba X has been implicitly discontinued, as it has not been updated since 2013, and the website is unavailable.

Tinyboard is a PHP based imageboard script with a MySQL backend. It was eventually discontinued and forked into vichan. Tinyboard (and its forks) notably feature extensibility with JavaScript.

Infinity is a fork of Vichan that allows user board creation. It is the basis for 8kun. Infinity has been discontinued, however it has been forked into OpenIB, which remains supported.

Active 
Taimaba is 420chan's proprietary continuation of Wakaba, overhauling it with many modern features and a public API. It is a hybrid Perl and PHP platform, as compared to Wakaba's static html output. This fork remains in use today, however the source has never been released.

TinyIB is a PHP-based imageboard software from the original developer of Kusaba, intended to be "lightweight and efficient". It supports MySQL, PostgreSQL, SQLite, and the lack of a database completely ("Flatfile"). Started in 2009, it still sees major active development as of 2021.

Vichan is a fork of Tinyboard "with more features and that receives security patches". It officially supports up to PHP 7.0, and though it has security support, the development team strongly urges users to "consider other imageboard packages" due to having "next to no active development".

LainChan is a fork of Vichan, intending to "actively build on it and add a lot of features and other improvements". It supports up to PHP 7.3.

Lynxchan is an imageboard based on JavaScript and Node.js. It requires a MongoDB database to run.

Danbooru-style boards 
Usually referred to as a "booru" (plural "boorus"). Unlike Futaba-inspired imageboard software packages, Danbooru and derivatives aim for a non-hierarchical semantic structure in which users are able to post content and add tags, annotations, translations, artist commentary, and comments.

There are a number of different Danbooru-style imageboards, both open-source and closed-source.

Imageboards

2ch

Dvach,  is a Russian imageboard that replaced 2ch.ru imageboard (originally known as dvach) which was shut down earlier on January 17, 2009; it thoroughly copied original layout and was heavily advertised over the internet and managed to succeed the original one in popularity. According to its owners number of posts left in the /b/ board exceeded 150 million. In September 2016 a pro-Russian government organisation, MAIL.RU, helped to organize "defense" against alleged DDOS attacks that took place during the same month; events raised concerns and speculations among users who grew suspicious over alleged takeover committed by the mail.ru and who criticized the owner's controversial decision to accept "help". As of October 2018 It was widely believed that imageboard was simply "sold" on undisclosed terms to pro-government organisation. The decision was met with high criticism of risks of disclosure of users' credentials in inherently anonymous-community to the government body that could potentially violate principles of anonymity, causing many to leave the board by the end of 2016. By 2019 it remains among the largest active Russian-speaking imageboards.

420chan 

An English-language imageboard based on cannabis culture which was created on 20 April 2005 by Aubrey Cottle. The name is a reference to the larger 4chan and the code term 420 of the cannabis subculture. Its boards include various drug-specific boards, as well as a board featuring a chatbot named Netjester.

4chan 

4chan is an English-language imageboard based on the Japanese imageboard Futaba Channel. This imageboard is based primarily upon the posting of pictures (generally related to a wide variety of topics, from anime and popular culture to politics and sports) and their discussion. The Guardian describes it as "at once brilliant, ridiculous and alarming."

The site and its userbase have received attention from the media for a number of reasons, including attacks against Hal Turner on his Internet shows, distributed denial-of-service attacks against eBaum's World, taking part in Project Chanology, and multiple cases of anti-animal abuse reports.

Many Internet memes have originated there, including lolcats, rickrolling, and Pedobear.

8chan 

8chan (or Infinitechan) was a primarily English-language imageboard, although it has sub-boards dedicated to other languages. Just like 4chan, 8chan is based on posting pictures and discussion anonymously, but unlike 4chan, 8chan lets its users decide what they want to discuss by allowing any user to create their own board dedicated to any topic, a concept first made popular by news bulletin boards like Reddit. 8chan also claims to have a strong dedication to freedom of speech and allows all content—so long as the discussion and board creation abides by United States law. However, local moderators enforce the rules of their own boards and may delete posts as they see fit. It is currently partnered with the Japanese textboard 2channel.

Futaba Channel 

Futaba Channel (ふたば☆ちゃんねる), or "Futaba" for short, is a popular, anonymous BBS and imageboard system based in Japan. Its boards usually do not distinguish between not safe for work and clean content, but there is a strict barrier between two-dimensional (drawn) and three-dimensional (computer graphics (CG) and photographic) pictures that is heavily enforced and debated.

Hispachan 
Hispachan was launched in November 2012 as a global imageboard for all Spanish-speaking countries. Vice Magazine describes it as "a site for completely anonymous Spanish-language discussion that has proven popular among hackers since its launch in 2012".

In January 2017, a shooting in a school in Monterrey (Mexico) was previously announced on Hispachan.

In June 2019, Vice accused some Hispachan discussions of being "collaborative misogyny".

In May 2022, Hispachan officially announced its closure on Twitter, it was temporarily available for a few days until all of its content was permanently deleted, it is currently known as lolnada.

Karachan 
Karachan is the largest Polish imageboard at 20 million posts, founded in 2010. Karachan has received attention from the Polish media after many trolling actions targeting Polish politicians, journalists and the Pope John Paul II. As of July 2019 the site consists of a (Polish-language) faux page claiming the site is "blocked" due to "invalid content". However, a manual is known to exist, informing how to enter the actual forum and browse its contents. Its name comes from the Polish word karaczan, which means a cockroach, an insect that is used as Karachan's logo.

Krautchan 
A primarily German-language imageboard that was founded in 2007. The name is an allusion to the ethnophaulism Kraut for Germans. Unlike most imageboards, posters on Krautchan didn't publish their postings under the generic name "Anonymous". The German name "Bernd" was used instead, and the Krautchan community identified themselves as "Bernds" instead of "Anons". In 2009, after the Winnenden school shooting, the interior minister of Baden-Württemberg cited a post on the imageboard in a press conference that appeared to forewarn of the shooting, but was later found to be fake.  The site also featured a popular English-language board, /int/, which was also the origin of the Polandball internet phenomenon and a number of other popular memes such as Wojak in August the same year.  On March 21, 2018, the imageboard was shut down. Two days later the imageboard kohlchan was founded as a replacement.

Wizardchan 
Wizardchan is an imageboard primarily dedicated to male incel culture and topics including anime, hobbies, and depression. Users on the depression board often discuss suicide or self-harm, and a controversy emerged in the board's community about whether to refer users to suicide prevention hotlines.

See also 
 Anonymous (group)
 Textboard
 Reddit

Citations

External links 
 Overscript—a list of imageboard software
 AllChans - OverChan V.3—a list of imageboards

 

Internet forum terminology
Internet culture
Internet forums